Hünten is a surname. Notable people with the surname include: 

Daniel Hünten (1760–1823), German organist, guitarist and composer
Emil Hünten (1827–1902), German military painter
Franz Hünten (1792–1878),  German pianist and composer